Andrew Haigh (born 7 March 1973) is a British filmmaker.

Early life
Haigh was born in Harrogate, North Yorkshire, England. He read History at Newcastle University.

Career
Haigh worked as an assistant editor on films such as Gladiator and Black Hawk Down before debuting as a writer/director with the short film Oil. In 2009 he directed his first feature-length film, Greek Pete, which debuted at the London Lesbian and Gay Film Festival. The film is set in London and centers on male prostitution, chronicling a year in the life of rent-boy Pete. Greek Pete won the Artistic Achievement Award at Outfest in 2009.

Haigh's second feature, the highly acclaimed romantic drama Weekend about a 48-hour relationship between two men (played by Tom Cullen and Chris New), premiered on 11 March 2011 at the SXSW Film Festival, where it won the Audience Award for Emerging Visions. The film played in many other festivals around the world, and went on to collect many more awards including the Grand Jury Award for Outstanding International Narrative Feature at L.A. Outfest and London Film Critics' Circle award for Breakthrough British Filmmaker.

Haigh's next film 45 Years premiered as part of the main competition at the 65th Berlin International Film Festival. The film won the top acting prizes at the festival for both its leads, Charlotte Rampling and Tom Courtenay. It was widely released in the UK on 28 August 2015, and was screened at the Telluride and Toronto film festivals in September 2015. The film later received an Academy Award nomination for Charlotte Rampling. Upon release, the film received positive reviews, holding a 97% rating on Rotten Tomatoes. Kate Taylor of The Globe and Mail wrote: "45 Years exposes the paradoxical balance of the successful marriage, one that requires a sentimental suspension of disbelief on the one hand and a hard-headed ability to deal with the everyday on the other."

Haigh co-created, co-produced and occasionally wrote and directed the HBO drama series Looking (2014–2016), about a group of gay men in San Francisco, which struggled to attract audiences despite receiving generally positive reviews from critics. Cancelled after two seasons, the series finished with a two-hour TV movie in 2016.

Haigh's next film, Lean on Pete, based on the Willy Vlautin novel about a teenage boy in Oregon, premiered at the 74th Venice International Film Festival in 2017. It was released in cinemas and on VOD in April–May 2018 and received critical acclaim.

In October 2016, Haigh was announced as the writer-director of The North Water, a mini-series based on the novel of the same name by Ian McGuire. Filming was expected to start in Summer 2018. After some filming delays in March 2020 due to the COVID-19 pandemic, it was release between 15 July and 12 August on BBC Two in 2021.

Personal life
Haigh is married to novelist Andy Morwood. The couple has two daughters. Haigh identifies as an atheist.

Filmography

Film

Television

References

External links

 Official website
 
 2013 Interview from The New York Times' "20 Directors to Watch" article

1973 births
Living people
English film directors
English screenwriters
English male screenwriters
English LGBT writers
LGBT film directors
British LGBT screenwriters
People from Harrogate
British gay writers
LGBT television directors
English television directors
21st-century LGBT people
English atheists
English atheist writers